The Avalon School is a private independent day school for boys currently in Wheaton, Maryland, United States. It is associated with the Brookewood School, a private school for girls in Kensington, Maryland, and the Thomas More Institute,  an umbrella program for homeschoolers.

Notable alumni
 Trevon Diggs, NFL player

References

External links

3-Time Maryland State Champion Baseball Team

Private K-12 schools in Montgomery County, Maryland
Catholic secondary schools in Maryland
Educational institutions established in 2003
2003 establishments in Maryland
Wheaton, Maryland